KOA Corporation (Japanese: コーア株式会社, Kōa kabushiki kaisha) is a multinational passive electronic components supplier based in Japan. The company was founded on March 10, 1940 and registered to become a public corporation on May 24, 1947. They manufacture resistors and other electronic parts.

References 

Electronics companies of Japan
Companies listed on the Tokyo Stock Exchange
Electronics companies established in 1940
Companies based in Nagano Prefecture
Japanese brands